Dark Avengers is a 2009–2013 American comic book series published by Marvel Comics. It is part of a series of titles that features various iterations of the superhero team the Avengers, with this version of the team - unbeknownst to the public in its stories - having several members who are actually supervillains and anti-heroes disguised as the established superheroes.

Publication history
The series debuted with issue #1, dated January 2009, as part of a multi-series story arc entitled "Dark Reign." In the premiere, writer Brian Michael Bendis and artist Mike Deodato (working from a continuity begun in a previous, company-wide story arc, "Secret Invasion," involving an infiltration of Earth by the shape-shifting alien Skrulls and that race's eventual defeat) chronicled the aftermath of the U.S. government's disbanding of the federally sanctioned superhero team, the Avengers. Bendis described the thinking behind the team: "These are bad-ass, hardcore get-it-done types. They'll close the door and take care of business and he's dressing them up to make them something that the people want. This is in contrast to the changes Norman Osborn is shown making to the Thunderbolts, where, according to writer Andy Diggle, he turns that team into "something much more covert and much more lethal: his own personal hit squad".

The series ended with Dark Avengers #16, at the culmination of the Siege storyline.

The Thunderbolts comic book was renamed Dark Avengers beginning with issue #175, but the creative team remained unchanged. Dark Avengers ended with issue #190.

Fictional team biography

First Dark Avengers
The government assigned the team's redevelopment to Norman Osborn (the reformed supervillain now calling himself the Iron Patriot) whom the government had previously assigned to head the superhero team the Thunderbolts and who had become a public hero for his role in repelling the Skrull threat. Osborn, also given leadership of the espionage agency S.H.I.E.L.D., reforms that agency into H.A.M.M.E.R. and creates a new Avengers team under its aegis.

The initial line-up consists of former Thunderbolts members and new recruits, including the Sentry, Ares, Noh-Varr (now Captain Marvel) as well as disguised super-villains Moonstone (portraying Ms. Marvel), Venom (Mac Gargan portraying Spider-Man after being given a formula that resets the symbiote to the size it was when it possessed Spider-Man), Bullseye (portraying Hawkeye) and Wolverine's disgruntled son Daken taking on the Wolverine mantle. Osborn also takes on the identity of Iron Patriot, wearing a red, white, and blue-themed Iron Man armor. The team goes to Latveria to rescue Doctor Doom from Morgan Le Fay. Upon returning from Latveria, Osborn deals with the aftermath of Ronin's appearance on live TV reminding the public of Osborn's murderous past and that he should not be trusted. Due to this action, Osborn is forced to "get rid of" this problem.

The Dark Avengers arrive in San Francisco to set up martial law and to quell the anti-mutant riots. In doing so, Norman sets up his own team of X-Men consisting of Cloak and Dagger, Mimic, Emma Frost, Namor the Sub-Mariner, Daken, Weapon Omega and Mystique (posing as Professor X) much to the chagrin of his Avengers. After Emma Frost, Namor, and Cloak and Dagger betray the team, Norman swears vengeance on the X-Men.

A series of disappearances throughout Colorado causes Norman Osborn's Dark Avengers (except for Venom) to visit the small town of Dinosaur, Colorado.  Everyone except Norman is teleported away, while Osborn finds himself in front of a throne with Molecule Man seated on it, flanked by the Beyonder, Mephisto, Zarathos, and the Enchantress. However, it is revealed that these others were merely Molecule Man's creations. Molecule Man tortures Norman mentally and physically and seemingly kills his Avengers. Osborn's assistant Victoria Hand successfully stalls Molecule Man with a false surrender until the Void is able to reform and kill Molecule Man. It is revealed that the Sentry and the Void have the same powers as Molecule Man. The Sentry regains control of himself and agrees to begin therapy with Moonstone, while Victoria Hand demands Norman to undergo therapy as well after being tortured. Inside his office, Loki is manipulating Norman into having a Green Goblin relapse.

After declaring war on the Asgardians, Norman Osborn has the Dark Avengers and those in The Initiative prepare for the Siege of Asgard. Norman considers The Sentry, specifically his dark side, known as The Void, his secret weapon.

In flashback, it is told how Robert Reynolds received his vast powers from experimental drugs, using his might as the Sentry to live the life of a superhero, while his darker emotions manifested as the Void. Osborn has manipulated Reynolds into allowing the Void to take over, to do Osborn's murderous bidding. Osborn has somehow recreated the addictive serum that gave Reynolds his powers, making him dependent on Osborn and his approval. Meanwhile, Reynolds's wife Lindy has been a virtual prisoner in the Sentry's Watchtower, has even attempted to kill him, and begs Reynolds to either kill her or let her go. Reynolds's warring personalities, however, have stalemated. The Sentry even attempts suicide, flying into the heart of the sun, but such is his invulnerability that it doesn't work. He tires of struggling against the Void. Norman orders Bullseye to kill Lindy, blaming her for Sentry's uncertainty and weakness. When an emergency evacuation occurs, Bullseye takes Lindy on a helicopter, antagonizes her cruelly, then strangles her to death and dumps her body into the ocean. When Sentry arrives looking for Lindy, Bullseye claims that she committed suicide, out of fear of Reynolds, by jumping out of the helicopter in the countryside. Sentry leaves to look for her body. From this point on, it could be said that the murderous Void was in full control of Reynolds and his unprecedented power.

Following the events of Siege, Norman Osborn is incarcerated in The Raft penitentiary. Moonstone, Bullseye and Venom are captured by the heroes, while Daken manages to escape capture by military personnel. After being interrogated by Captain Rogers, Victoria Hand is informed that she has been reassigned. Moonstone joins Luke Cage's incarnation of the Thunderbolts. Noh-Varr is recruited into the Avengers team to help them build a time machine to save the future. Victoria Hand is assigned by Steve Rogers to be the liaison for Luke Cage's team of Avengers, dubbed the New Avengers, because he feels that she can provide an important insight to the team. Bullseye escapes custody and is killed by his longtime nemesis Daredevil when he attacks his fortress of Shadowland during the storyline of the same name. Daken eludes capture at the conclusion of the Siege of Asgard and is confronted by Franken-Castle (whom he had killed during the Dark Reign). Mac Gargan's symbiote is removed and he is taken into custody. Alistair Smythe breaks Gargan out of prison who is transformed back into the Scorpion.

New Dark Avengers
A new Dark Avengers team is formed by Norman Osborn and H.A.M.M.E.R. The roster includes Skaar, Gorgon, Ai Apaec, Dr. June Covington, Superia, and Trickshot. The team is backed up by HYDRA and A.I.M. Norman Osborn also has A.I.M. rebuild Ragnarok so that he can join the Dark Avengers. Although Osborn claims to be certain that his new team is superior to their "templates," he appears unaware that Madame Hydra and Gorgon are already planning to kill him once he proves himself to be too dangerous as leader, intending to use his team to sow discord by serving as a voice of the "disenfranchised" unsatisfied with the status quo. The subsequent fight against the New Avengers proves to be relatively evenly matched. Although Osborn demonstrates a surprising new level of strength allowing him to throw Luke Cage a considerable distance and his Scarlet Witch injures Doctor Strange, the others are able to hold their own far more easily. When they attempt to teleport away, the New Avengers end up facing Ragnarok. Spider-Man and Iron Fist are able to defeat Ragnarok, but the Dark Avengers' actions have still damaged the New Avengers' reputations by tricking them into provoking a fight with a team who just helped the civilians, Osborn's other forces attacking the main team to charge them with various war crimes, ordering the President to declare Osborn the new head of world security and put the Avengers on trial.

The Dark Avengers capture Captain America during their successful attack on both Avengers teams with the intention of executing him for his 'crimes'. Gorgon and Superia are already planning to betray the team, while Victoria Hand, apparently Norman's double agent inside the team, reveals to the New Avengers her real allegiance to Captain America and Skaar turns on his teammates after they confirm their intentions to assault Captain America, exclaiming the famous rallying cry, "Avengers Assemble!" as he does so. Skaar reveals that he is a double agent for Captain America, allowing the New Avengers to defeat the rest of the team. Norman Osborn is shown to have developed the abilities of the Super-Adaptoid, enabling him to copy the abilities of the other Avengers. The Avengers find a way to overload this power, which puts Norman Osborn into a coma. After Osborn is defeated, the rest of the Dark Avengers are detained. It is suggested in a conversation with Captain America that they be considered for the Thunderbolts Program.

As of #175, Thunderbolts is renamed Dark Avengers with writer Jeff Parker and the art team of Kev Walker and Declan Shalvey remaining on the title. When the Thunderbolts are missing in the time stream, the Dark Avengers were recruited as a replacement team. In order to keep the Dark Avengers in line, they were implanted with nanites and placed under the leadership of Luke Cage.

The Dark Avengers team are thrown into the alternate world of Earth-13584 with John Walker (U.S. Agent) where they are captured by that reality's version of Iron Man. It turns out that A.I.M. is behind the reality manipulation. Due to the Dark Avengers' arrival, the solar system is starting to disappear. The Dark Avengers enter the A.I.M. base and accelerate the sliver's destruction. The Dark Avengers arrive back in their world. Skaar hops away, but the rest of the team ponders what to do as most of them are still criminals. June Covington bewitches U.S. Agent into believing they could still work as a team and steps on a still miniaturized Ai Apaec.

Roster

Founders

Post-Fear Itself recruits

Marvel ReEvolution recruits

Reception

Accolades 

 In 2018, CBR.com ranked the Dark Avengers 13th in their "25 Most Powerful Avengers Teams" list.
 In 2020, CBR.com ranked the Dark Avengers 6th in their "Marvel: 10 Most Powerful Teams" list.
 In 2022, Sportskeeda ranked the Dark Avengers 6th in their "10 best supervillain teams in comics" list.
 In 2022, CBR.com ranked the Dark Avengers 3rd in their "10 Marvel Teams That Exceeded Expectations" list and 10th in their "13 Strongest Avengers Rosters" list.

Other versions

Ultimate Marvel
In the Ultimate Marvel reality, an alternate version of the Dark Avengers appears under the name the Dark Ultimates. The group consists of a female Kang the Conqueror and Reed Richards as well as the former Ultimates Hulk and Quicksilver. The team is formed with the goal of forcibly saving the world by any means necessary. They first appear while attacking the Triskelion in order to steal the Infinity Gems.

In other media

Television
The Dark Avengers appear in a self-titled episode of Avengers Assemble. This version of the group are reality-flipped versions of the original Avengers who operate as supervillains while the Squadron Supreme work to stop them. However, the Dark Avengers eventually discover that the Squadron used the Reality Gem to change the world in their image and use it to undo the Squadron's changes.

Video games
 The Dark Avengers appear in Marvel: Avengers Alliance. This version of the group is formed by Dell Rusk and consists of Bullseye operating as Hawkeye, Daken operating as Wolverine, Ragnarok, Yelena Belova / Black Widow, and Mac Gargan / Venom.
 The Dark Avengers appear in Marvel Puzzle Quest, consisting of Ares, Bullseye, Daken, Moonstone, Ragnarok, Sentry, Mac Gargan / Venom, and Yelena Belova.

Collected editions
The series is being collected into individual volumes:

 Volume 1: Dark Avengers Assemble (collects Dark Avengers #1–6, 160 pages, premiere hardcover, September 2009, softcover, December 2009)
 Dark Avengers/Uncanny X-Men - Utopia (collects Dark Avengers #7-8, "Dark Avengers/Uncanny X-Men: Utopia" "Utopia Finale" and Uncanny X-Men #513-514, 352 pages, hardcover, December 2009, softcover, April 2010)
 Volume 2: Molecule Man (collects Dark Avengers #9-12, 112 pages, premiere hardcover, February 2010)
 Dark Avengers: Siege (collects Dark Avengers #13-16, and Dark Avengers Annual #1, 144 pages, Marvel Comics, premiere hardcover, July 2010)
 Dark Avengers: The End is the Beginning (collects Dark Avengers #175-183, softcover, February 2013)
 Dark Avengers: Masters of Evil (collects Dark Avengers #184-190, softcover, July 2013)

All the issues (Except the Utopia crossover) are being collected into one hardback book:
 Dark Avengers Marvel (collects Dark Avengers #1-6, #9-16 and Annual #1, hardcover, 400 pages, July 2011)

As were the spin-offs:
 Ms. Marvel:
 Volume 7: Dark Reign (collects Ms. Marvel #35-40, 176 pages, Marvel Comics, premiere hardcover, September 2009, softcover, December 2009)
 Volume 8: War of The Marvels (collects Ms. Marvel #41-46, 120 pages, Marvel Comics, premiere hardcover, January 2010, softcover, May 2010)
 Dark Wolverine:
 Volume 1: The Prince (collects Wolverine #73-74 and Dark Wolverine #75-77, 112 pages, Marvel Comics, premiere hardcover, October 2009, softcover, March 2010)
 Volume 2: My Hero (collects Dark Wolverine #78-81, 112 pages, Marvel Comics, premiere hardcover, April 2010)
 Siege: X-Men - Dark Wolverine & New Mutants (includes Dark Wolverine #82-84, 128 pages, Marvel Comics, premiere hardcover, June 2010)
 Dark Reign: Sinister Spider-Man (collects Dark Reign: The Sinister Spider-Man #1-4, 112 pages, Marvel Comics, softcover, January 2010)
 Dark Avengers: Ares (collects Ares #1-5 and Dark Avengers: Ares #1-3, 192 pages, Marvel Comics, softcover, April 2010)
 Dark Reign: Hawkeye (collects Dark Reign: Hawkeye #1-5, 120 pages, Marvel Comics, softcover, May 2010)

References

External links
 Explaining it All: Brian Bendis Talks Dark Avengers #1, Newsarama, January 22, 2008
 
 Dark Avengers at Marvel Wiki
 Dark Avengers at Comic Vine
 

2010 comics endings
Comics set in New York City